Swineshead railway station serves the village of Swineshead in Lincolnshire, England. Although named Swineshead, the station is, in reality, located in the hamlet of Swineshead Bridge some miles north of Swineshead. The line was opened by the Boston, Sleaford and Midland Counties Railway.

The station is now owned by Network Rail and managed by East Midlands Railway who provide all rail services.

The station is unstaffed and offers limited facilities other than two shelters, bicycle storage, timetables and modern 'Help Points'. The full range of tickets for travel are purchased from the guard on the train at no extra cost, there are no retail facilities at this station.

Services
All services at Swineshead are operated by East Midlands Railway.

On weekdays and Saturdays, the station is served by a limited service of two trains per day in each direction, westbound to  via  and eastbound to  via .

There is no Sunday service at the station, although a normal service operates on most Bank Holidays.

References

External links

Railway stations in Lincolnshire
DfT Category F2 stations
Former Great Northern Railway stations
Railway stations in Great Britain opened in 1859
Railway stations served by East Midlands Railway